Yuraq Yuraq (Quechua yuraq white, the reduplication indicates there is a complex or a group of something, "white complex", or yuraq yuraq common name of Gochnatia boliviana, also spelled Yuraj Yuraj) is a mountain in the Khari Khari mountain range of the Bolivian Andes, about 4,920 m (16,142   ft) high. It is situated southeast of Potosí in the Potosí Department. Yuraq Yuraq lies southeast of  Illimani and northeast of Q'illu Urqu.

References 

Mountains of Potosí Department